Stelios Kritikos (born 10 January 1986) is a Greek professional footballer who plays as a centre forward for Proodeftiki.

External links
 AEL 1964 FC Official
 Profile at Sportlarissa.gr

1986 births
Living people
Panathinaikos F.C. players
Ethnikos Asteras F.C. players
Ethnikos Piraeus F.C. players
Ionikos F.C. players
Ilioupoli F.C. players
A.O. Glyfada players
Kalamata F.C. players
Vyzas F.C. players
Athlitiki Enosi Larissa F.C. players
Association football forwards
Footballers from Athens
Greek footballers